The extension of the Vijayanagara Empire into the Tamil country began with the southern inroads made by Sangama kings between 1356 and 1378 after defeating the Padaivedu Kingdom. With the destruction of the Madurai Sultanate in 1377-78, most of the present-day Tamil Nadu eventually came under the rule of the Vijayanagara Empire. While the rulers of Vijayanagara primarily patronised works of Kannada and Sanskrit, they did not express much interest in Tamil poetry. Krishnadevaraya is known to have only patronised the Tamil poet Harihara, who wrote the Irusamaya vilakkam (An exposition on Shaivism and Vaishnavism). For 300 years Tamils were ruled by the Vijayanagara kings. The Vijayanagara Empire's hold over the Tamil country collapsed in the mid 16th century as the kingdom itself disintegrated into a number of petty chieftainships.

History 

The Vijayanagara Empire was founded by two brothers Harihara and Bukka, who were captured by the Emperor of Delhi, Muhammad bin Tughlaq and forcibly converted to Islam but later escaped and launched a crusade against the Muslim invaders. In 1336, they founded the city of Vijayanagara on the banks of the Tungabhadra which they made their capital and undertook repeated campaigns against the northern invaders. The campaigns eventually culminated in the overwhelming defeat of the forces of the Delhi Sultanate and the restoration of Hindu rule in South India.

Literature 

Tamil literature from this period came from Tamil speaking regions ruled by the feudatory Pandya who gave particular attention on the cultivation of Tamil literature, some poets were patronised by the Vijayanagara kings. Svarupananda Desikar wrote an anthology of 2824 verses, Sivaprakasap-perundirattu, on the Advaita philosophy. His pupil the ascetic, Tattuvarayar, wrote a shorter anthology, Kurundirattu, that contained about half the number of verses. Krishnadevaraya patronised the Tamil Vaishnava poet Haridasa whose Irusamaya Vilakkam was an exposition of the two Hindu systems, Vaishnava and Shaiva, with a preference for the former.

Notes 

 
Vijayanagara Empire